Trace is an unincorporated community in Mingo County, West Virginia, United States. The town's post office no longer exists.

Etymology

The origin of the name Trace is obscure, although it may be derived from nearby Dingess Trace Branch Creek.

References 

Unincorporated communities in West Virginia
Unincorporated communities in Mingo County, West Virginia